Boloria aquilonaris, the cranberry fritillary, is a butterfly of the family Nymphalidae. It is found in northern and central Europe.

Description
The wingspan is 34–40 mm. Upperside orange with brown basal suffusion and adorned with various marks of brown colour, submarginal round spots and lines forming festoons.

The underside of the forewing is lighter and more coloured, that of the hindwing reddish and presenting silver spots.

Biology
The butterfly flies from June to August depending on the location.
The larvae feed on cranberry and Andromeda polifolia.

Gallery

References

Boloria
Butterflies of Europe
Cranberries
Butterflies described in 1908